Taokeng Township is a rural township in Chaling County, Hunan Province, People's Republic of China.

Cityscape
The township is divided into 24 villages, the following areas: Kengkou Village, Shangping Village, Dafen Village, Shitan Village, Yekeng Village, Taokeng Village, Shangyuan Village, Zhongyuan Village, Maxi Village, Daijiang Village, Tianhe Village, Xiale Village, Dongjiang Village, Zhongdong Village, Nankeng Village, Xikeng Village, Datang Village, Xiangjiang Village, Guaping Village, Chunfeng Village, Jiaoping Village, Xiaofeng Village, Huali Village, and Caixia Village.

References

External links

Divisions of Chaling County